Biləsuvar may refer to

Biləsuvar, the capital city of Bilasuvar Rayon in Azerbaijan
Biləsuvar (village), a village in the Bilasuvar Rayon of Azerbaijan
Bilasuvar District, a rayon in Azerbaijan
Bilasavar, the capital city of Bileh Savar County in Ardabil Province, Iran